The 1918–19 United States collegiate men's ice hockey season was the 25th season of collegiate ice hockey.

Regular season

Standings

References

1918–19 NCAA Standings

External links
College Hockey Historical Archives

 
College